Murray Arndell McBride (born 28 April 1935) is a Canadian politician and author. McBride served as a Liberal party member of the House of Commons of Canada.

Born at Westmeath, Ontario, McBride was first elected at the Lanark and Renfrew riding in the 1968 general election and served only one term, the 28th Canadian Parliament. McBride was defeated in the 1972 election by Paul Dick of the Progressive Conservative party at the riding which became Lanark—Renfrew—Carleton. McBride campaigned for election in the High Park--Humber Valley riding, but was also unsuccessful then. He has not contested for a Parliamentary seat since.

Murray McBride served as Executive Assistant to the Postmaster General in 1973 and 1974. From 1974 to 1976 he was Executive Assistant to the Minister of Consumer and Corporate Affairs. From 1976 to 1978 he was Vice Chairman and General Manager of the Farm Credit Corporation of Canada and from 1978 to 1979 he was Chairman of the Canadian Egg Marketing Agency.

External links
 

1935 births
Living people
Members of the House of Commons of Canada from Ontario
Liberal Party of Canada MPs